Hotel der toten Gäste is a 1965 German thriller film directed by Eberhard Itzenplitz and starring Joachim Fuchsberger, Karin Dor, Frank Latimore, Wolfgang Kieling and Elke Sommer. The police are called to a hotel, filled with visitors in town for the Sanremo Music Festival, where one of the guests has been murdered.

The film was shot in Bavaria.

Cast
 Joachim Fuchsberger as Barney Blair
 Karin Dor as Gilly Powell
 Frank Latimore as Larry Cornell
 Hans Nielsen as Inspector Forbesa
 Renate Ewert as Lucy Balmore
 Gisela Uhlen as Ruth Cornell
 Claus Biederstaedt as Morton Marlowe
 Monika Peitsch as Agnes Green
 Ady Berber as Teddy
 Enrique Guitart as J.J. Frank
 Manuel Collado as Barutti
 Wolfgang Kieling as Jack Courtney
 Gus Backus as Bucci
 Panos Papadopulos as Janos Kovacs
 Elke Sommer as herself (singing: Ich sage "no")
 Hannelore Auer as herself (singing: In Athen gibt es ein Wiedersehn)

References

External links 
 

1965 films
1960s thriller films
1960s musical films
German thriller films
German musical films
West German films
1960s German-language films
Films set in Italy
1960s German films